Luman (also Romanized as Lūmān) is a village in Jamabrud Rural District, in the Central District of Damavand County, Tehran Province, Iran. At the 2006 census, its population was 207, in 98 families.

According to the history of the village, "Agha Jan Hasannajari" was the most famous person who has built mosque and the first public bath in this village.
Luman consists of several major families, such as Hasannajari and Khalil.

References 

Populated places in Damavand County